The Scottish heavy metal band Alestorm has released seven studio albums, two live albums, five EPs, and nineteen music videos.

Albums

Studio albums

Live albums

EPs

Singles

Music videos

References

External links
Alestorm official website
Alestorm discography at AllMusic
Alestorm discography at Discogs
Alestorm discography at MusicBrainz

Heavy metal group discographies
Discographies of British artists